The Women's 400 metre individual medley event at the 2013 Southeast Asian Games took place on 16 December 2013 at Wunna Theikdi Aquatics Centre.

There were 8 competitors from 5 countries who took part in this event. No Qualification was held since only 8 swimmers competed.

Schedule
All times are Myanmar Standard Time (UTC+06:30)

Records

Results

Final

References

External links

Swimming at the 2013 Southeast Asian Games
2013 in women's swimming